Jul i främmande hamn is a Christmas song written by Sven Rüno, and recorded by Johnny Bode for Sonora, released in November 1938 as the B-side of "Den sista julresan" and by Erik Källqvist, released as an A-side for Columbia in December the same year. The song has also been recorded by Yngve Stoor, released on his 1957 EP White Christmas.

Lyrical, the song depicts a group of sailors from Sweden celebrating Christmas in a seaport town named Rio Grande, in an unnamed country. The song also includes a piece out of Alice Tegnér's song Kring julgranen.

In 1970, Thory Bernhards recorded the song as Rolle, with lyrics by John Algot.

References

1938 songs
Swedish Christmas songs
Swedish-language songs